Hero Nation – Chapter Three is third studio album recorded by the German power metal band Metalium and released in 2002.

Track listing
All songs by Metalium

"Source of Souls" - 1:13
"Revenge of Tizona" - 3:45
"In the Name of Blood" - 4:24
"Rasputin" - 5:34
"Odin's Spell" - 6:26
"Accused to Be a Witch" - 4:45
"Throne in the Sky" - 3:29
"Odyssey" - 4:35
"Fate Conquered the Power" - 5:28
"Infinite Love" - 5:42
"Heronation / Heart of the Tiger" - 12:26

Personnel
Band members
Henning Basse - vocals  
Matthias Lange - guitars  
Lars Ratz - bass, producer, mixing  
Michael Ehré - drums

Additional musicians
Don Airey - keyboards on tracks 1, 3, 5, 6
Ken Hensley - Hammond organ on track 9
Tom Naumann - guitar solos on track 9
Stefan Schlahritz - vocals on tracks 1, 3, 4
Carolin Fortenbacher - vocals on tracks 1, 3, 10

Production
Eduardo Garcia - mixing

References

External links
Metalium Official Website

Metalium albums
2002 albums
Massacre Records albums